The Letter is a first-person adventure mystery video game developed and published by Eli Brewer of American indie developer TreeFall Studios. The player takes the role of a young boy, Michael Kennedy, who receives a mysterious letter from his missing father and begins a quest to find him. The game was developed on a $377 budget across one to two months, and subsequently released on the Nintendo eShop on July 10, 2014. Critical reception was strongly negative upon its release, with some reviewers stating that it was not a legitimate game, and others suggesting its removal from the eShop. It is considered one of the worst video games of all time.

Gameplay
The player takes on the role of a young boy named Michael Kennedy. He receives a letter from his father which states that he has been hired for an "off the books" construction job in a valley down the road from their mountain home, and that he could be dead by the time Michael receives it. Michael decides to go searching for his father. The Letter is a narrative-based game where the player finds clues and uses objects to assist in the search for the boy's father.

Development and release
Eli Brewer was inspired to make The Letter after listening to soundtracks of horror games including Eternal Darkness: Sanity's Requiem, ZombiU, Call of Duty: Zombies, and Resident Evil. With the lack of mystery horror games for the Wii U at the time, Brewer wanted "to shake up the landscape of the game selection with [The Letter]". Fundraising on Indiegogo lasted from March 5 to March 24, 2014 and resulted in only $377 being pledged, 8% of the $5,000 goal. Brewer developed the game part-time, in one to two months, and said that even with a $5,000 budget, the game still would not have been as good as he thought it could have been.

On June 24, it was announced by TreeFall that Nintendo approved The Letter for release on the Nintendo eShop. It is the company's first game release and although initially planned for May, it became available in the store on July 10. On August 13, a trailer for version 1.1 was released, adding new items, creatures, and environments.

Critical reception

The Letter received almost uniformly negative reviews from critics. , the game holds an aggregate 12.52% on GameRankings (which closed in 2019), and 14 out of 100 on Metacritic, where it also ranks as the fifth worst-reviewed game ever released, as well as the number-one worst-reviewed adventure game. Both of the aggregate scores are based upon four reviews. Criticisms covered the total lack or poor quality of every aspect of the product: gameplay, presentation, production values, plot, and length. Some reviewers asked why Nintendo approved it on the eShop at all, and others stated that they did not think it was really a game.

A zero-out-of-ten-star review came from Albert Lichi of Cubed3, who called The Letter Brewer's "attempt to exploit ignorant consumers". NintendoLife's Dave Letcavage, awarding the game one out of ten stars, named it a "half-formed thought scribbled, almost illegibly, across a post-it note". In a review for Hardcore Gamer, Nikola Suprak gave The Letter a one out of five, concluding that the game "needs to die an unloved death on the Nintendo eShop purchased by absolutely no one". Daan Koopman, writing for Nintendo World Report, said that it "shows that honest intentions will not always get you a good game", and he scored it a two out of ten. Jonathan Holmes of Destructoid called it "an unbelievable new Wii U eShop game", comparing it to other cheaply made games that were released on the WiiWare, including Muscle March, Eco Shooter: Plant 530, and Monsteca Corral. WiiU Daily's Ashley King, opining that it should not be on the eShop, used it as an example of the major issues with Nintendo's quality control, saying it was "an embarrassment for the developer, but most of all...an embarrassment for Nintendo". In a less harsh review, Trevor Gould, reviewing for Pure Nintendo Magazine, said that, even though the game ended way too abruptly and felt unfinished, it is "not bad while it lasts".

Brewer responded to the negative reception of the game:

References

External links
The Letter at Nintendo.com

2014 video games
Adventure games
Video games developed in the United States
Wii U eShop games
Wii U-only games
Wii U games
Single-player video games